Interpellator is the student magazine of Charles Sturt University's Bathurst campus in New South Wales, Australia. It is funded by the Bathurst SRC and advertising, but is editorially independent. Most readers and editors shorten the name to "Interp".

The members vote for a President, vice-president and Treasurer to a one-year term. Eight  issues are released annually, two per term.  Content ranges from commentary on student, state, national and international politics to pressing social issues to the latest fashions.

Interpellator was first published in the 1970s when the campus was named the Mitchell College of Advanced Education. Long after other student newspapers published in colour, it remained a black-and-white publication, printed by the local newspaper, Western Advocate, until 1994 when it was first sent to Sydney for colour printing.

A fire in early 1992 destroyed the Interpellator office and much of the Link Building which housed it, along with a library of past editions and memorabilia, such as graffiti left on the office walls by past editors. For a year, the newspaper operated from a demountable near the campus radio station 2MCE FM, until in mid-1993 reconstruction of the Link Building was completed and Interpellator was moved into its rebuilt office. These days the Interpellator office is housed above Rafters Bar in the C4 Building.

Notable former editors of Interpellator include author Ashley Hay, science writer Bob Beale, Triple J newsreader Michael Turtle, and marketing writer with The Australian, Lara Sinclair.

In 2014 the magazine was completely revamped and redesigned by the new team. The student publication was renamed simply to 'Interp' and an official logo was created by the team.

The current editors and director of Interp are:
Editors-in-Chief: Tahlia Sarv and Kate Neilson 
Creative Director: Caitlin Christensen

External links 

Student newspapers published in Australia